Andrew Florent (24 October 1970 – 16 August 2016) was an Australian professional tennis player.

Florent was born in Melbourne to parents who had migrated from Mauritius.  He enjoyed most of his tennis success while playing doubles.  During his career he won 3 doubles titles and finished runner-up an additional 10 times.  He achieved a career-high doubles ranking of World No. 13 in 2001.

Florent died from colorectal cancer at the age of 45 on 16 August 2016. He is the father of the Sydney AFL footballer Oliver Florent.

Career finals

Doubles (3 titles, 7 runners-up)

References

External links
 
 
 

1970 births
2016 deaths
Australian male tennis players
Tennis players from Melbourne
Australian people of Mauritian descent
Deaths from colorectal cancer
Deaths from cancer in Australia
20th-century Australian people
Sportsmen from Victoria (Australia)